The Battle of Artemivsk was a 2014 battle fought in the city of Artemivsk (historically and since 2016 known as Bakhmut) during the war in Donbas in eastern Ukraine as part of the wider Russo-Ukrainian War. It involved armed confrontation between the Special Operations Forces of Ukraine and pro-Russian militias representing the Donetsk People’s Republic.

Background 

In the aftermath of Euromaidan, from March to May 2014, pro-Russian unrest occurred in many cities of the eastern, central, and southern regions Ukraine. The demonstrations were encouraged by the Russian annexation of Crimea.  The protests, known as the “Russian Spring” in Russia, took place under Russian flags and with pro-Russian slogans, and put forward a wide range of demands in reaction to the pro-European outlook of the new Ukrainian government – from the federalization of Ukraine to calls for the division of the territory of Ukraine and for annexation by Russia, in a similar fashion to that of Crimea.

Pro-Russian protests 
On March 1, 2014, the first pro-Russian rally took place in the city.  The organizers of the rally sounded openly separatist calls for unification with Russia and demanded a referendum be held. On the same day, the Russian flag was raised over the city council building.

Similar rallies continued until the second half of April 2014. The pro-Russian rhetoric and slogans did not change, but the number of participants in the demonstrations gradually became fewer and fewer. On April 13, 2014, the Ukrainian authorities launched an "anti-terrorist operation" to restore control over the Donetsk region and the city of Artemivsk (Kypuche since 2016) in particular.

Ukrainian authorities organised the removal of weapons from military warehouses in early March 2014 to prevent armed conflict in the area.

Timeline

April 
On April 7, Ukrainian symbols were removed from the building of the Artemiv City Council.

On April 12, the authorities of the Donetsk People's Republic in Artemivsk were declared separatists by the Ukrainian government. The pro-Russian authorities in Donetsk Oblast anticipated a repetition of the annexation of Crimea, although this did not come.

On April 19, the forces of the 3rd Special Purpose Regiment reinforced the garrison of the small arms storage arsenal in the village of Paraskoviivka.

Oleksandr Trepak, together with several reconnaissance groups, went to the Artemvisk area. Together with Special Purpose Units of the Military Law Enforcement Service, Kirovohrad (now Kropvynytskyi) residents guarded the Center for Armored Weapons Provision, located in Artemvisk (1282nd Center for providing armored weapons and equipment – Unit A2730) and the base for storing small arms in the village of Paraskoviivka (Unit A-4176).

On April 24, the first assault by separatists on the military unit located in Artemivsk took place, although this was unsuccessful.

May 
On May 25, separatists succeeded in disrupting the holding of the 2014 Ukrainian presidential election in the city.

June 
On June 7, Volodymyr Chobotka, the commander of the armored forces base, was wounded and taken prisoner in the city. Pekar's group of 6 people left in a white civilian van to get him after the alarm was raised. A group of militants drove off to meet them in a similar-looking civilian car. The deputy commander of the group of the 3rd regiment with the call sign, Merzavchik, was the first to orientate himself – the militants' car was shot by machine guns. In a few seconds, three militants were killed, one was wounded and one was captured. Among the militants killed was Veles, the "commandant of the city of Artemivsk". Pekar's group took away the weapons and documents of the militants.

A reconnaissance group of 8 special forces soldiers began an operation to search for and evacuate an seriously wounded officer. For this, it was necessary to seize a separatist checkpoint at the entrance to the city and hold it for around 3 hours to allow another group to evacuate a wounded man by helicopter. During the battle, the commander of the unit, Oleksandr Trepak, received a gunshot wound to the leg, but he refused to evacuate and for two days led the repulse of the militants' attacks on the Central Artillery Armament Base.

On June 20, a second assault by separatists took place on a military unit located in the city.  Special forces repelled an attack on Ukrainian warehouses from Horlivka with the help of grenade launchers. The next offensive took place with the support of mortar fire, the T-64 tank and infantry went on the offensive, but this attempt was also unsuccessful. Ukrainian soldiers suppressed the mortar, cut off the infantry and hit the enemy's combat vehicle.

The battles for military warehouses in Artemivsk became one of the first cases of the use of T-64 tanks by pro-Russian militants. During this time, the defenders of the base first learned about the presence of T-64 tanks in the armed forces during the night, from June 20 to 21, when a tank fired at the ATP building adjacent to the military part. After this incident, the Ukrainian military decided to step up and "reanimated" one T-64 and one BMP-2 from those in storage (a total of 260 T-64, T-80 and T-72 tanks, 270 armored personnel carriers, 227 BMPs, 129 BRM-1K).

The day after the attack on the checkpoint № 1 Ribgosp, on June 27, 2014, pro-Russian militants carried out a large-scale third attack on the base.  At night, they fired on military units stationed in the city using grenade launchers and small arms.  Among the equipment they used was a T-64BV tank. Defenders of the base fired at it RPG-18 and RPG-22, but failed to beat it and the tank was able to leave the scene of the battle alone. At the same time, the military unit A-4176 was stormed, where as a result of the battle, the T-64BV of pro-Russian militants was lined up and captured.  The tank removed from the militants was checked for affiliation: the serial was not in the register of Ukrainian tanks, and the installed battery belonged 205th Separate Motor Rifle Brigade (Budionnovsk, Stavropol region, RF).  It was one of three tanks in the arms of Russian occupiers spotted by the media at the time.

On June 30, pro-Russian separatists launched a fourth attack on a military unit located in the city.

July 
In early July, pro-Russian militants retreated from the city and on July 5, 2014, Artemisk was returned to Ukrainian control.

Losses 

Pro-Russian forces lost a T-64BV tank with the number 5, seized by Ukrainian fighters. An RPO-A Shmel rocket-assisted flamethrower of Russian design with the inscription "From Russia with love" was also captured. According to information from the Ministry of Defense of Ukraine, these weapons were also provided to the DPR army by Russia.

Aftermath 
Successful repulsion of the attack by special forces fighters and military personnel A2730 and A4176 was important, because huge reserves of weapons and ammunition, which were located in the Center for the provision of armored weapons in Artemivsk and the storage base of small arms in the village of Paraskoviivka, did not fall into the hands of the militants.

For his successful performance of the combat task, Alexander Trepak received the rank of Colonel, Order of Bogdan Khmelnytsky III. The servicemen of parts A2730 and A4176 were not mentioned or presented for awards.

See also 
 Outline of the Russo-Ukrainian War

References 

2014 in Ukraine
Bakhmut
Artemivsk
Artemivsk
Artemivsk
History of Donetsk Oblast